The 2004 Delaware gubernatorial election was held on November 2, 2004, coinciding with the U.S. presidential election. Incumbent Governor Ruth Ann Minner faced a serious challenge from retired Superior Court Judge Bill Lee, but managed a five-point victory on election day. , this was the last time Kent County voted for the Republican candidate in a gubernatorial election or that the statewide margin was within single digits.

Primaries

Democratic Party
Ruth Ann Minner, incumbent Governor of Delaware

Republican Party
Bill Lee, former Delaware Superior Court Justice
David Charles Graham, state government employee
Michael D. Protack, pilot

Independent Party/Libertarian Party
Frank Infante, Independent Party of Delaware and Libertarian Party of Delaware fusion ticket nominee

Campaign

Predictions

Election results

See also
Politics of Delaware

References

Delaware
2004
Governor